The 2012 BMW PGA Championship was the 58th edition of the BMW PGA Championship, an annual golf tournament on the 2012 European Tour, contested 24–27 May at Wentworth Club in Surrey, England. Englishman Luke Donald successfully defended his PGA Championship title and regained the World Number One status.

Course layout

Past champions in the field 
Ten former champions entered the 2012 BMW PGA Championship.

Made the cut

Missed the cut

Nationalities in the field

Round summaries

First round (Thursday)

Second round (Friday)

Third round (Saturday)

Final round (Sunday) 
Luke Donald started the final round with a two-stroke lead over countryman Justin Rose. After being caught by Justin Rose four holes into the final round, Donald birdied 6, 7 and 10 to gain a three shot lead. The gap went to five at the 16th when Donald made another birdie, while Rose bogeyed after hitting a bunker. Paul Lawrie hit a best-of-the-day 66 to catch Rose. They finished tied second with a final score of −11, four shots behind champion Donald. 
Luke Donald is only the third player, after Nick Faldo and Colin Montgomerie, to win successive PGA Championship titles. He also regained the World Number One ranking by retaining his title.

References

BMW PGA Championship
BMW PGA Championship
BMW PGA Championship
Golf tournaments in England
BMW PGA Championship